The Greek Field Hockey Championship or Greek Field Hockey League was the most important domestic competition of the Field Hockey in Greece. The championship started after founding of Hellenic Hockey Federation in 1994. There have been eighteen championships until abolishing of Hockey Federation during November 2014. The Greek Federation was abolished for the ground that the number of teams was less of required number. Also there have been serious complaints for conducting fake youth championships in order to participant pupils to have taken bonus grades for universities' entrance examinations.

Champions

Outdoor's Championships

Performance by club
AOH Hymettus: 10
1995, 2001, 2002, 2003, 2004, 2006, 2007, 2009, 2010, 2011
Napaios Apollon: 3
1999, 2005, 2008
AOH Agios Andreas: 2
1996, 2000, 2018
Ethnikos Piraeus: 2
2012, 2014
Asteras Agioi Anargyroi: 1
2013

References

External links
Greek field hockey federation

Field hockey competitions in Greece
Men's field hockey leagues in Europe
field hockey
Sports leagues established in 1994